Mahinārangi Tocker  (1955 – 15 April 2008) was a singer-songwriter from New Zealand. Tocker wrote more than 600 songs in a 25-year career.  Her vocal style has been compared to that of Joan Armatrading and Tracy Chapman. She also gave lectures around New Zealand about the use of music and creativity to boost learning and self-esteem, and was an adult literacy tutor, writer and poet.

Biography

Tocker was born in Taumarunui and was of Ngāti Raukawa, Ngāti Tūwharetoa, Ngāti Maniapoto, Jewish and Celtic ancestry. Tocker spent much of her life at Glendene in West Auckland.

In the 2008 New Year Honours, Tocker was appointed a Member of the New Zealand Order of Merit for services to music.

Tocker died on 15 April 2008 in Auckland's North Shore hospital following a severe asthma attack. She was 52. Her final performance had been at the Titirangi Festival of Music in March 2008. A memorial tree was planted for her at Falls Park in Henderson.

Personal life

Tocker came out openly as a lesbian. Tocker openly talked about her diagnosis with bipolar disorder.

Discography
Albums 
 1985 Clothesline Conversation
 1987 I'm Going Home
 1996 Mahinarangi
 1997 Te Ripo
 2002 Hei Ha!
 2002 Touring (With Charlotte Yates)
 2005 The Mongrel in Me

References

1955 births
2008 deaths
20th-century New Zealand women singers
Deaths from asthma
Lesbian singers
New Zealand lesbian musicians
New Zealand LGBT singers
Members of the New Zealand Order of Merit
New Zealand Māori women singers
Ngāti Maniapoto people
Ngāti Raukawa people
Ngāti Tūwharetoa people
People from Taumarunui
20th-century New Zealand LGBT people
21st-century New Zealand LGBT people